Skjold is a former municipality in Rogaland county, Norway.  The  municipality encompassed all the area surrounding the Grindafjorden and Skjoldafjorden.  The area is located in the present-day municipalities of Vindafjord and Tysvær.  The administrative centre of the municipality was the village of Skjold where the Skjold Church is located.

History
The parish of Skjold was established as a municipality on 1 January 1838 (see formannskapsdistrikt law). In 1849, the southwestern half of Skjold (population: 2,058) was separated to form the new municipality of Tysvær, leaving Skjold with 3,439 residents.  In 1891, the eastern district of Skjold (population: 1,095) was separated to form the new municipality of Vats, leaving Skjold with 1,961 residents.  On 1 January 1964, a small part of northern Skjold located north of the Ålfjorden (population: 24) was transferred to Sveio municipality in Hordaland county.

On 1 January 1965, the municipality of Skjold was dissolved based on recommendations to the government of Norway by the Schei Committee.  The districts of Liarheim and Langeland (population: 1,262), mostly located north and east of the Grindafjorden, were merged with the municipality of Sandeid and parts of the municipalities of Imsland, Vats, and Vikedal to create the new municipality of Vindafjord.  The districts Dueland, Grinde, and Yrkje (population: 1,133), mostly located south and west of the Grindafjorden and Skjoldafjorden, were merged with the municipalities of Tysvær and Nedstrand and parts of the municipalities of Avaldsnes, Vats, and Vikedal to form the new, larger municipality of Tysvær.

Government
All municipalities in Norway, including Skjold, are responsible for primary education (through 10th grade), outpatient health services, senior citizen services, unemployment and other social services, zoning, economic development, and municipal roads.  The municipality is governed by a municipal council of elected representatives, which in turn elects a mayor.

Municipal council
The municipal council  of Skjold was made up of 17 representatives that were elected to four year terms.  The party breakdown of the final municipal council was as follows:

See also
List of former municipalities of Norway

References

Tysvær
Vindafjord
Former municipalities of Norway
1838 establishments in Norway
1965 disestablishments in Norway